Mammea siamensis (saraphi, สร้อยภี soiphi in Southern Thai) is a species of flowering plant in the Calophyllaceae family. Its name in Vietnamese is Trau tráu.

It is an evergreen tree with fragrant yellow or white flowers, and a small oval fruit. It is found in Thailand and Laos where it is called "salapee"; and also in Vietnam and Cambodia.

References

External links
A terpenoid and two steroids from the flowers of Mammea siamensis 
Phenolic compounds from Mammea siamensis seeds

siamensis
Flora of Indo-China
Trees of Vietnam